A Serbian barrel is a sterilization device used for sterilizing clothes. It consists of a wooden or metal barrel or other container which is then heated to disinfect items hung inside it by moist heat sterilization.

The Serbian barrel was pioneered by the British surgeon William Hunter during the 1915 typhus and relapsing fever epidemic in Serbia.

References 

Medical equipment
Sterilization (microbiology)
20th-century inventions